The Anguilla Strategic Alliance is a political party in Anguilla. 
At the last elections, 21 February 2005, the party won 19.2% of popular votes and 2 out of 7 elected seats.

Electoral results

Political parties in Anguilla